Charles Hickey may refer to:

 Charles Hickey (RAF officer) (1897–1918), Canadian World War I flying ace
 Charles Hickey (cricketer) (1880–1919), New Zealand cricketer
 Charles A. Hickey (1874–1929), American football coach
 Charles Erastus Hickey (1840–1908), physician and political figure in Ontario, Canada
 Charlie Hickey (coach) (born 1964), American college baseball coach
 Charlie Hickey (musician), American indie rock musician